Last Chance, No Breaks is the sole solo studio album by American rapper Jamal. It was released on October 10, 1995 via Rowdy Records. Production was handled by Redman, Rockwilder, Easy Mo Bee, Erick Sermon, Mike Dean, Erotic D. and PME, with Dallas Austin serving as executive producer. It features guest appearances from Redman, Erick Sermon, George Clinton, Keith Murray, L.O.D. and Passion.

The album proved to be a commercial failure, peaking at #198 on the Billboard 200, #37 on the Top R&B/Hip-Hop Albums, and #10 on the Top Heatseekers in the United States. It spawned two charted singles: "Fades Em All", which made it to #9 on the Hot Rap Singles, and "Keep It Real", which made it to #17 on the same chart.

Track listing

Sample credits
Track 5 samples "Ready to Die" by Notorious B.I.G.
Track 9 samples "Ribbon in the Sky" by Stevie Wonder
Track 10 samples "The Boogie Man" by The Jackson 5

Chart history

References

External links
Last Chance, No Breaks on Bandcamp

1995 debut albums
Jamal (rapper) albums
Albums produced by Rockwilder
Albums produced by Easy Mo Bee
Albums produced by Erick Sermon
Albums produced by Mike Dean (record producer)
Rowdy Records albums